Marcin Wicha (born 1972, in Warsaw, Polish People's Republic) is a Polish graphic designer, children's author, and essayist.

Early life
Wicha was born in Warsaw in 1972, to a family of Jewish origin the son of Piotr Wicha (1946-2006), an architect, and his wife, Joanna Rabanowska-Wicha (1946-2015), the grandson of Jan Rabanowski from his father's side, who was a politician and minister of communications of Poland during the Communist period and of Władysław Wicha from his mother's side, who served as Ministry of Interior.

Career
He has been a cartoonist for the Catholic weekly magazine Tygodnik Powszechny, and has contributed cartoons to the monthly magazine Charaktery and the daily newspaper Gazeta Wyborcza.

He has written a number of children's books.

His 2017 book Rzeczy, których nie wyrzuciłem received the 2017 Polityka Passport for literature, the 2018 Nike Literary Award, and the Witold Gombrowicz Literary Award, and was shortlisted for the Gdynia Literary Prize. It was translated into English and published in 2021 under the title Things I Didn't Throw Out. It is partly an autobiographical novel and partly a meditation on the loss of loved ones. In translation it was awarded a PEN Translates Award by English PEN in 2021.

Works (in English translation)
Things I Didn't Throw Out (2021: Daunt Books, translated by Marta Dziurosz), 
How I Stopped Loving Design (online excerpt, Public Seminar, translated by Marta Dziurosz)

References 

1972 births
Living people
Writers from Warsaw
Polish essayists
21st-century Polish male writers